The Brumby Aircraft Brumby 600, also known as the Brumby LSA 600 is an Australian single-engined, two-seat, training or touring cabin monoplane. The aircraft is built by Brumby Aircraft Australia as a production or kit aircraft at Cowra Airport near Cowra, New South Wales, Australia. Designed to meet regulations governing light sport aircraft (LSA), it was developed from the Goair Trainer.

Design and development
The Brumby was developed from the GoAir GT-1 Trainer, which was built at Bankstown Airport in Sydney during the late 1990s.

The Brumby 600 is a low-wing monoplane of all-metal construction. It has a fixed tricycle landing gear and an enclosed cockpit for two in side-by-side configuration with a forward-sliding canopy for access; sideways-opening gull-wing doors are available as an optional kit. It can be powered by a  Lycoming IO-233,  Rotax 912ULS or  Jabiru 3300 engine, driving a wooden two-blade propeller.

A high-wing version has been developed as the Brumby 610 Evolution.

Specifications

References

 
 

2000s Australian civil utility aircraft
Brumby Aircraft Australia aircraft